Ian Dobson may refer to:

Ian Dobson (athlete), American long-distance runner and 2008 Olympic athlete
Ian Dobson (footballer) (born 1957), former Australian soccer player